The toponym Villarejo can refer to:

 Villarejo, La Rioja, Spain
 Villarejo de Fuentes, Cuenca, Castilla-La Mancha, Spain
 Villarejo de Salvanés, Madrid, Spain
 Villarejo-Periesteban, Cuenca, Castilla-La Mancha, Spain
 Villarejo de Montalbán, Toledo, Castilla-La Mancha, Spain
 Villarejo del Valle, Ávila, Castilla y León, Spain
 Villarejo de la Peñuela, Cuenca, Castilla-La Mancha, Spain
 Villarejo de Órbigo, León, Castilla y León, Spain